Myosin light polypeptide 6 is a protein that in humans is encoded by the MYL6 gene.

Myosin is a hexameric ATPase cellular motor protein. It is composed of two heavy chains, two nonphosphorylatable alkali light chains, and two phosphorylatable regulatory light chains. This gene encodes a myosin alkali light chain that is expressed in smooth muscle and non-muscle tissues. Genomic sequences representing several pseudogenes have been described and two transcript variants encoding different isoforms have been identified for this gene.

References

Further reading